Joe Salmon (born 1931 in Galway, Ireland) is a former Irish sportsperson.  He played hurling at various times with his local club Meelick-Eyrecourt before switching, for a short period, to Liam Mellows in Galway and Glen Rovers in Cork because of migration. 

Salmon also played with the Galway senior inter-county team from 1949 until 1964.

Playing career

Club
Salmon played his club hurling with his local club Meelick-Eyrecourt.  He also played with the Glen Rovers club in Cork.  In all, Salmon collected five county championship medals.

Inter-county
Salmon first came to prominence with the Galway minor inter-county team in the 1940s.  He lined out in the All-Ireland final of 1947, however, Tipperary were the victors on that occasion.

Salmon later joined the Galway senior team, however, as the county faced no competition in the Connacht Senior Hurling Championship, the team went straight into the All-Ireland series every single year. 

Salmon first tasted success with Galway in 1951.  That year his side reached the finals of the National Hurling League.  Galway defeated Wexford and New York giving Salmon a National League medal.

Two years later in 1953 Galway defeated the Kilkenny team in the penultimate stage of the championship.  This victory allowed Salmon's side to advance to the All-Ireland final where Cork provided the opposition. Galway lost the game by 3-3 to 0-8.  After the match at the Gresham Hotel in Dublin a fight broke out when another Galway player struck Cork's Christy Ring. The following morning another fight broke out when another member of the Galway panel attempted to hit Ring.  The fights, however, ended just as quickly as they had started.

Five years later in 1958 Galway were given a bye into the All-Ireland final in an effort to improve the standard of hurling in the county.  Tipperray provided the opposition on that occasion. Liam Devaney, Donie Nealon and Larry Keane all scored goals for Tipp in the first-half, while Tony Wall sent a 70-yard free untouched to the Galway net. Tipp won the game by 4-9 to 2-5.

This defeat saw Galway enter the Munster Championship in 1959. Salmon retired from inter-county hurling in 1964.

Provincial
Salmon also lined out with Connacht in the inter-provincial hurling competition, however, he never won a Railway Cup medal.

References
 Corry, Eoghan, The GAA Book of Lists (Hodder Headline Ireland, 2005)

External links
 Galway GAA honours 

1931 births
Living people
Liam Mellows hurlers
Glen Rovers hurlers
Galway inter-county hurlers
Connacht inter-provincial hurlers